Lieutenant General William Amherst (5 February 1732 – 13 May 1781) was a British military commander. In 1762 during the Seven Years' War he led British forces that defeated a French expedition which had occurred earlier that year in St. John's, Newfoundland at the Battle of Signal Hill.

Early life
William Amherst was born, in Sevenoaks, Kent, into a family of lawyers. He was the son of Jeffery Amherst and Elizabeth Kerril and the brother of Field Marshal Jeffery 1st Lord Amherst and Admiral John Amherst. He later married Elizabeth Amherst (Patterson). Their children included:

 William Pitt Amherst, 1st Earl Amherst of Arracan, GCH, PC, a future Governor-General of India 
 Elizabeth Frances Amherst

Seven Years' War

Amherst was commissioned as an ensign in the First Regiment of Foot Guards in 1755. He eventually rose to the rank of lieutenant general in 1779. As a lieutenant colonel, Amherst was instrumental in the re-capture of St. John's from the French in 1762 at the Battle of Signal Hill. An area near Signal Hill at the entrance of St. John's harbour is named "Fort Amherst" in commemoration of his victory in 1762.

In 1766 he became Member of Parliament for Hythe, and in 1768 he became MP for Launceston until 1774.

In 1769 he built a house in Ryde, on the Isle of Wight. He named the house and estate St John's, after his victory in Newfoundland. The neighborhood of Ryde that surrounds the house is still known by that name.

He was appointed Adjutant-General to the Forces in 1778: he died while serving in that role in 1781.

Notes

References

External links
 Biography at Newfoundland Grand Banks
 The Rooms article on Conflict in Newfoundland

1732 births
1781 deaths
Military personnel from Kent
British military personnel of the French and Indian War
British MPs 1761–1768
British MPs 1768–1774
Grenadier Guards officers
People from Sevenoaks
Members of the Parliament of Great Britain for English constituencies
Members of the Parliament of Great Britain for Launceston
British Army lieutenant generals
32nd Regiment of Foot officers